Martin Field may refer to:

 Martin Field (Nebraska), an airport in South Sioux City, Nebraska, United States (FAA: 7K8)
 Martin Field (Texas), a stadium near the Texas Wesleyan University campus in Fort Worth, Texas, United States
 Martin Field (Washington), an airport in College Place, Washington, United States (FAA: S95)
 Martin Field (West Virginia), on the campus of West Virginia University Institute of Technology
 Martin Field Airport (Alaska), an airport in Lazy Mountain, Alaska, United States (FAA: AK92)
 Martin Scott Field (born 1955/56), bishop of the Episcopal Diocese of West Missouri

See also
 Martin Airport (disambiguation)